Catherine Rosalind Russell (June 4, 1907November 28, 1976) was an American actress, comedienne, screenwriter, and singer, known for her role as fast-talking newspaper reporter Hildy Johnson in the Howard Hawks screwball comedy His Girl Friday (1940), opposite Cary Grant, as well as for her portrayals of Mame Dennis in Auntie Mame (1958) and Rose in Gypsy (1962). A noted comedienne, she won all five Golden Globes for which she was nominated. Russell won the Tony Award for Best Actress in a Musical in 1953 for her portrayal of Ruth in the Broadway show Wonderful Town (a musical based on the film My Sister Eileen, in which she also starred). She was nominated for the Academy Award for Best Actress four times during her career before being awarded a Jean Hersholt Humanitarian Award in 1973.

In addition to her comedic roles, Russell was known for playing dramatic characters, often wealthy, dignified, and stylish women. She was one of the few actresses of her time to portray women in professional roles such as judges, reporters, and psychiatrists. Russell's career spanned from 1930s to the 1970s and she attributed this longevity to the fact that, although she had many glamorous roles, she never became a sex symbol.

Early years
Catherine Rosalind Russell was one of seven children born in Waterbury, Connecticut, to James Edward, a lawyer, and Clara A. Russell (née McKnight), a teacher. The Russells were an Irish-American, Catholic family. She was named after a ship on which her parents had traveled. Russell attended Catholic schools, including the women's-only Rosemont College in Rosemont, Pennsylvania and Marymount College in Tarrytown, New York. She then attended the American Academy of Dramatic Arts in New York City. Her parents thought Russell was studying to become a teacher and were unaware that she was planning to become an actress. Upon graduation from the performing arts school, Russell acted in summer stock and joined a repertory company in Boston.

Career

Early career
Russell began her career as a fashion model and was in many Broadway shows. Against parental objections, she took a job at a stock company for seven months at Saranac Lake, New York, and then Hartford, Connecticut. Afterwards, she moved to Boston, where she acted for a year at a theater group for Edward E. Clive. Later, she appeared in a revue in New York (The Garrick Gaieties). There, she took voice lessons and had a brief career in opera, which was cut short because she had difficulty reaching high notes.

In the early 1930s, Russell went to Los Angeles, where she was hired as a contract player for Universal Studios. When she first arrived on the lot, she was ignored by most of the crew and later told the press she felt terrible and humiliated at Universal, which affected her self-confidence. Unhappy with Universal's leadership, and second-class studio status at the time, Russell set her sights on Metro-Goldwyn-Mayer, and was able to get out of her Universal contract on her own terms. When MGM first approached her for a screen test, Russell was wary, remembering her experience at Universal. However, when she met MGM's Benny Thau and Ben Piazza, she was surprised, as they were "the soul of understanding". Her screen test was directed by Harold S. Bucquet, and she later recalled that she was hired because of a closeup he took of her.

Under contract to MGM, Russell debuted in Evelyn Prentice (1934). Although the role was small, she received good notices, with one critic saying that she was "convincing as the woman scorned". She starred in many comedies such as Forsaking All Others (1934) and Four's a Crowd (1938), as well as dramas, including Craig's Wife (1936) (the second of three film adaptations of the play of the same name; Joan Crawford starred in the third) and The Citadel (1938). Russell was acclaimed when she co-starred with Robert Young in the MGM drama West Point of the Air (1935). One critic wrote: "Rosalind Russell as the 'other woman' in the story gives an intelligent and deft handling to her scenes with Young." She quickly rose to fame, and by 1935, was seen as a replacement for actress Myrna Loy, as she took many roles for which Loy was initially set.

In her first years in Hollywood, Russell was characterized, both in her personal life and film career, as a sophisticated "lady". This dissatisfied Russell, who said in a 1936 interview:

Being typed as a lady is the greatest misfortune possible to a motion picture actress. It limits your characterizations, confines you to play feminine sops and menaces and the public never highly approves of either. An impeccably dressed lady is always viewed with suspicion in real life and when you strut onto the screen with beautiful clothes and charming manners, the most naive of theatergoers senses immediately that you are in a position to do the hero no good. I earnestly want to get away from this. First, because I want to improve my career and professional life and, secondly because I am tired of being a clothes horse – a sort of hothouse orchid in a stand of wild flowers.

Russell approached director Frank Lloyd for help changing her image, but instead, Lloyd cast her as a wealthy aristocrat in Under Two Flags (1936). She was then cast as catty gossip Sylvia Fowler in the comedy The Women (1939), directed by George Cukor. The film was a major hit, boosting Russell's career and establishing her reputation as a comedienne.

Russell continued to display her talent for comedy in the classic screwball comedy His Girl Friday (1940), directed by Howard Hawks. In the film, a reworking of Ben Hecht's story The Front Page, Russell plays quick-witted ace reporter Hildy Johnson, who was also the ex-wife of her newspaper editor Walter Burns (Cary Grant). Russell had been, as she put it, "Everyone's fifteenth choice" for the role of Hildy in the film. Before her being cast, Howard Hawks had asked Katharine Hepburn, Irene Dunne, Claudette Colbert, Jean Arthur, Margaret Sullavan, and Ginger Rogers if they would like to play the brash, fast-talking reporter in his film. All of them refused. Russell found out about this while riding on a train to New York, when she read an article in The New York Times stating that she had been cast in the film and listing all the actresses who had turned the part down.

Later career
In the 1940s, Russell made more comedies including The Feminine Touch (1941), Take a Letter, Darling and My Sister Eileen (both 1942), dramas including Sister Kenny (1946) and Mourning Becomes Electra (1947), and a murder mystery: The Velvet Touch (1948).

Russell scored a big hit on Broadway with her Tony Award-winning performance in Wonderful Town (1953), a musical version of her successful film of a decade earlier, My Sister Eileen. Russell reprised her starring role for a 1958 television special.

Perhaps her most memorable performance was in the title role of the long-running stage comedy Auntie Mame (based on a Patrick Dennis novel) as well as the 1958 film version, in which she played an eccentric aunt whose orphaned nephew comes to live with her. When asked with which role she was most closely identified, she replied that strangers who spotted her still called out, "Hey, Auntie Mame!" She received a Tony Award nomination for Best Actress in a Play in 1957 for her performance. Patrick Dennis dedicated his second Auntie Mame novel Around the World with Auntie Mame to "the one and only Rosalind Russell" in 1958.

She continued to appear in movies through the mid-1960s, including Picnic (1955), A Majority of One (1961), Five Finger Exercise (1962), Gypsy (1962), The Trouble with Angels (1966), and its sequel Where Angels Go, Trouble Follows (1968). Russell was the logical choice for reprising her role as Auntie Mame when the musical version Mame was set for a production on Broadway in 1966, but she declined for health reasons.

In addition to her acting career, Russell (under the name C.A. McKnight) also wrote the story for the film The Unguarded Moment (1956), a story of sexual harassment starring Esther Williams. Russell used the pen name C.A. McKnight again in 1971, when she was credited as screenwriter for adapting the novel The Unexpected Mrs. Pollifax into the screenplay for Mrs. Pollifax-Spy, in which she also starred. It was Russell's last big screen role.

Awards and nominations
Over the course of her career, Russell earned four Academy Award nominations for Best Actress: My Sister Eileen (1942); Sister Kenny (1946); Mourning Becomes Electra (1947); and Auntie Mame (1958), the film version of her Broadway comedy hit. She received a Special Academy Award, the Jean Hersholt Humanitarian Award, in 1972, which came with an Oscar statuette.

Other honors
In 1972, Russell received the Golden Plate Award of the American Academy of Achievement. Russell also won five Golden Globe Awards in her career and a Tony Award. She also has a star on the Hollywood Walk of Fame.

Russell is honored at the Rosalind Russell Medical Research Center for Arthritis. Her portrait and a description of her work hangs in the lobby, as Congress made a grant in 1979 to establish the research center, in honor of her Congressional appointment to the National Commission on Arthritis.

Personal life
On October 25, 1941, Russell married Danish-American producer Frederick Brisson (1912–1984), son of actor Carl Brisson. Cary Grant was responsible for the couple's having met, and was the best man at Frederick and Rosalind's wedding. Brisson had been traveling from England to the United States by ship in 1939, and The Women was playing on an endless loop during the voyage. After hearing the audio for the film day after day while traveling, Brisson decided he had better sit down and watch the whole film. He became so enamored with Russell's performance as Sylvia Fowler that he turned to his friends and proclaimed: "I'm either gonna kill that girl, or I'm gonna marry her".

Brisson stayed with Cary Grant in his guest house while Grant was filming His Girl Friday. Upon hearing that Grant was making the movie with Russell, Brisson asked his friend if he could meet her. Cary Grant then spent weeks greeting Russell each morning on set with the question "Have you met Freddie Brisson?" in an effort to pique the actress's curiosity. One night, when Russell opened her door to let Grant in before they went dancing, as they often did, she found him standing next to a stranger. Grant sheepishly explained that the odd fellow was Freddie Brisson, the man whom he had mentioned so often, and they set off for dinner, with Freddie in tow.

Russell and Brisson were married 35 years, until her death. They had one child in 1943, a son, Carl Lance Brisson.

Russell was a registered Republican who supported the 1960 campaign of Richard Nixon.

Russell was a devout Catholic, and a member of the Good Shepherd Parish and the Catholic Motion Picture Guild in Beverly Hills, California.

Death

Russell died of breast cancer on November 28, 1976. She was survived by her husband and her son. She is buried in Holy Cross Cemetery in Culver City, California.

Russell has a star on the Hollywood Walk of Fame in the 1700 block of Vine Street.

Her autobiography Life Is a Banquet, written with Chris Chase, was published a year after her death. The foreword (written by her husband) states that Russell had a mental breakdown in 1943. She did not act in films in 1944. Details are scant, but the book indicates that health problems and the deaths of a sister and a brother were major factors leading to her breakdown. Russell had rheumatoid arthritis, and an arthritis research center at the University of California, San Francisco currently bears her name.

In 2009, the documentary film Life Is a Banquet: The Life of Rosalind Russell, narrated by Kathleen Turner, was shown at film festivals across the U.S. and on some PBS stations.

Work

Film

Television

Broadway theatre

Radio appearances

References

External links

 
 
 
 Forever Mame: The Life of Rosalind Russell by Bernard F. Dick
 Profile at Turner Classic Movies
 Photographs and bibliography
 Frederick Brisson papers, 1934–1984 (includes Rosalind Russell papers), held by the Billy Rose Theatre Division, New York Public Library for the Performing Arts

1907 births
1976 deaths
20th-century American actresses
20th-century Roman Catholics
American Academy of Dramatic Arts alumni
American female models
American film actresses
American musical theatre actresses
American people of Irish descent
American women comedians
Best Drama Actress Golden Globe (film) winners
Best Musical or Comedy Actress Golden Globe (film) winners
Columbia Pictures contract players
Burials at Holy Cross Cemetery, Culver City
Deaths from cancer in California
Deaths from breast cancer
Donaldson Award winners
Jean Hersholt Humanitarian Award winners
Screen Actors Guild Life Achievement Award
Metro-Goldwyn-Mayer contract players
Writers from Waterbury, Connecticut
Tony Award winners
Actresses from Connecticut
20th-century American singers
20th-century American women singers
Catholics from Connecticut
20th-century American comedians
Actors from Waterbury, Connecticut
Connecticut Republicans
California Republicans